Martijn Tusveld (born 9 September 1993) is a Dutch racing cyclist, who currently rides for UCI WorldTeam . He rode at the 2014 UCI Road World Championships. In August 2018, he was named in the startlist for the Vuelta a España. In October 2020, he was named in the startlist for the 2020 Giro d'Italia.

Major results

2012
 10th Overall Tour of China I
2013
 1st  Young rider classification Rhône-Alpes Isère Tour
 3rd Time trial, National Under-23 Road Championships
 4th Liège–Bastogne–Liège U23
2014
 2nd Paris–Tours Espoirs
2015
 2nd Time trial, National Under-23 Road Championships
 2nd Paris–Tours Espoirs
 3rd Piccolo Giro di Lombardia
 8th Overall Olympia's Tour
 9th Trofej Umag
 9th Liège–Bastogne–Liège U23
 10th Overall Le Triptyque des Monts et Châteaux
2016
 1st Mountains classification Ronde van Midden-Nederland
 2nd Overall Istrian Spring Trophy
1st Stage 2
 4th Overall Tour de Normandie
1st  Young rider classification
 8th Overall Abu Dhabi Tour
2017
 10th Overall Tour of Austria
 10th Overall Circuit de la Sarthe
2019
 10th Overall Tour of Guangxi
2021
 1st  Mountains classification Tour des Alpes-Maritimes et du Var

Grand Tour general classification results timeline

References

External links
 

1993 births
Living people
Dutch male cyclists
Sportspeople from Utrecht (city)
Cyclists from Utrecht (province)